Israel Sharon (Hebrew: ישראל שרון) (born in Tel Aviv, 25 May 1966) is an Israeli composer, pianist, arranger and conductor.

As a young man Israel Sharon studied piano with Alexander Volkov and composition with Abel Ehrlich. He later studied at the Music Rubin Academy, Tel Aviv, where he continued his composition studies with Leon Schidlowsky. Israel Sharon also studied at Rice University in Houston, Texas.

Since 1992 he has been a leading member of the Israeli Kaprizma Ensemble as a composer, conductor and pianist. He has composed numerous works for the ensemble many of which were also recorded by the ensemble.

He has done arrangements of other compositions including one of Maurice Ravel's Daphnis and Chloe for 16 instruments.

His works have been performed by Kaprizma as well as by leading international artists such as Pierre Strauch, Alain Damiens, Julius Berger, Wolfgang Meyer, Cihat Askin, Sava Stoianov and members of the Chamber Music Society of Lincoln Center to name but few. His composition were presented concerts and festivals in many countries including Germany, Austria, Russia, South Korea, USA, Cyprus, Hungary and Israel.

Compositions

compositions for solo instruments 
Seven Movements for solo guitar, composed for Hanan Feinstein, 1994
Variations on a Spanish Folksong, for viola or violin solo, 2007
Desert Music III - Five Etudes for Guitar (2007)

Chamber music 
Duo for Trumpet and Cello recorded by Sava Stoianov, 2007
Duo for Trumpet and Cello
Duo for Bassoon and Horn (1995)
Duo for Violin and Viola
Duo for Viola and Guitar
Sonata for Violin and Piano (1995)
Sonata for cello and Piano
Divertimento for Horn, Viola and Guitar (1996)
Trio for Clarinet, Guitar and Triangles (1993)
Trio for Flute, Clarinet and Guitar
Desert Music - Four pieces for Viola, Guitar and Percussion
Quartet  - for two Percussionists and two Basses
Violin Sonata - for Violin, Piano, Harpsichord and Celesta (one player), with Viola and Horn obbligati
Sonata for Viola and Piano with Clarinet, Guitar and Percussion obbligato

Chamber music with voice 
Four Songs by Lorca (Spanish) for female voice, bassoon, guitar, cello
Three Songs by Lorca (Spanish) for voice, 2 guitars, percussion

Large Ensembles 
Four Bagatellesfor two Celli and ensemble composed for Julius Berger and Kaprizma
Instrumental Cantata for Flute, Oboe, Clarinet, Bassoon, Horn, Trombone, Piano, Viola and Cello
The Concert in the egg - two movement after Hieronymus Bosch for Clarinet, Horn, Guitar, Viola and Cello
The Raise in the Salary after George Perec for Clarinet, Guitar, Piano and String Trio
Three Preludes and Fugues for 2 violins, viola and 2 Celli

Opera 
The Bald Soprano,a chamber opera based on a play by Eugène Ionesco, 2009
premiered at the Jerusalem Music Centre - December 24, 2009

Orchestral 
Passacaglia and Allegro (2008) for youth string orchestra
Variations on a theme by Satie for piano and chamber orchestra

Educational activities
Israel Sharon is a faculty member of the Israel Arts and Science Academy and of the Buchman Mehta School of Music in Tel Aviv. In the last five years he has also been leading in Israel a pioneering program of composition studies for young musicians within the frameworks of the Israeli Center for Excellence Through Education.

Awards 
In 2002 Israel Sharon was awarded the Israeli Prime Minister Composition award.

Recordings 
Many of Israel Sharon's works has been recorded by the Kaprizma Ensemble and are available for free listening and downloading at the ensemble's website.

References

External links 
Israel Sharon sheet music
 
Pamela Hickman on The Bald Soprano

Israeli composers
Living people
1966 births